Fremont County is a county located in the U.S. state of Iowa. As of the 2020 census the population was 6,605, making it the state's seventh-least populous county. The county seat is Sidney. The county was formed in 1847 and named for the military officer John C. Fremont.

Geography

Major highways
  Interstate 29
  U.S. Highway 59
  U.S. Highway 275
  Iowa Highway 2
  Iowa Highway 333

Adjacent counties
 Mills County  (north)
 Page County  (east)
 Atchison County, Missouri  (south)
 Otoe County, Nebraska  (southwest)
 Cass County, Nebraska  (northwest)

History 
Fremont County was impacted by the 2019 Midwestern U.S. floods. Buyouts are under discussion for  residents in Hamburg and McPaul.

Demographics

2020 census
There were 3,110 housing units, of which 2,720 were occupied.

2010 census
There were 3,431 housing units, of which 3,064 were occupied.

2000 census

As of the census of 2000, there were 8,010 people, 3,199 households, and 2,242 families residing in the county.  The population density was 16 people per square mile (6/km2).  There were 3,514 housing units at an average density of 7 per square mile (3/km2).  The racial makeup of the county was 98.01% White, 0.04% Black or African American, 0.24% Native American, 0.24% Asian, 0.96% from other races, and 0.51% from two or more races.  2.17% of the population were Hispanic or Latino of any race.

There were 3,199 households, out of which 30.20% had children under the age of 18 living with them, 58.90% were married couples living together, 8.20% had a female householder with no husband present, and 29.90% were non-families. 26.30% of all households were made up of individuals, and 14.90% had someone living alone who was 65 years of age or older.  The average household size was 2.45 and the average family size was 2.93.

In the county, the population was spread out, with 25.10% under the age of 18, 6.00% from 18 to 24, 24.30% from 25 to 44, 24.70% from 45 to 64, and 19.80% who were 65 years of age or older.  The median age was 41 years. For every 100 females there were 95.50 males.  For every 100 females age 18 and over, there were 91.80 males.

The median income for a household in the county was $38,345, and the median income for a family was $46,547. Males had a median income of $30,822 versus $23,003 for females. The per capita income for the county was $18,081.  About 6.50% of families and 9.50% of the population were below the poverty line, including 11.40% of those under age 18 and 10.70% of those age 65 or over.

Communities

Cities

 Farragut
 Hamburg
 Imogene
 Randolph
 Riverton
 Shenandoah (part)
 Sidney
 Tabor
 Thurman

Census-designated places
 Anderson
 Bartlett
 Percival

Other unincorporated places
 McPaul

Townships
Fremont County is divided into thirteen townships:

 Benton
 Fisher
 Green
 Locust Grove
 Madison
 Monroe
 Prairie
 Riverside
 Riverton
 Scott
 Sidney
 Walnut
 Washington

Population ranking
The population ranking of the following table is based on the 2020 census of Fremont County.

† county seat

Politics
Prior to 1944, Fremont County was a swing county in presidential elections, voting for the national winner in every election from 1904 to 1940. Starting with the 1944 election, the county has become a Republican Party stronghold, only failing to back a Republican presidential candidate in 1964 amidst Lyndon B. Johnson's national landslide.

Education
School districts include:
 Fremont-Mills Community School District
 Hamburg Community School District
 Shenandoah Community School District
 Sidney Community School District

Former school districts:
 Farragut Community School District

See also

 Fremont County Courthouse (Iowa)
 National Register of Historic Places listings in Fremont County, Iowa

References

External links

 

 
1847 establishments in Iowa
Iowa counties on the Missouri River
Populated places established in 1847